Al-Khaleej is an Arabic word which means "gulf".

Khaleej  may refer to:
 In Gulf Arabic, it primarily refers to the Persian Gulf, on the coast of which the Gulf Arabic dialects are spoken.
Haliç, the Turkish name of the Golden Horn in Istanbul

Media
Akhbar Al Khaleej, Bahrain newspaper
Dar Al Khaleej, UAE publishing company based in Sharjah, UAE
Al Khaleej (newspaper), newspaper brand published by Dar Al Khaleej
Khaleej Times, English newspaper brand based in Dubai, UAE
D 92 road (United Arab Emirates), also known as Al Khaleej Road

Sports
Khaleej FC, Saudi Arabia football club
Al Khaleej Club, a UAE football club
Khaleej Sirte, Libyan football club
Nusoor al Khaleej, Libyan football club